The 2017 Provo Premier League was the 17th season of the top football division in the Turks and Caicos Islands. The season began on 14 January and concluded on 20 May 2017.

Regular season

Champions Playoff

Championship final
Academy            4-4 Beaches            [6-7 pen]

Plate Playoff

Plate Final
Cheshire Hall      2-1 SWA Sharks

References

Provo Premier League
Turks and Caicos Islands
Turks and Caicos Islands